The West Kimberley Football Association is an Australian rules football competition in the far North West of Western Australia.

The league covers an area from Bidyadanga in the west to Derby in the east.  Games are played during the day in Broome and Derby with the majority of games and all finals taking place on Haynes Oval in Broome.  At the end of the 2005 season there were eight teams participating – Broome Bulls, Broome Saints, Towns, Bidyadanga Emus, Peninsula Bombers, Cable Beach Greenbacks, Derby Lightning and Mowanjum Hawks.  In 2006 the Looma Eagles joined the competition after leaving the Central Kimberley Football League (CKFL).

Current Clubs 

List of clubs competing in the WKFA (correct as of 2022 Season):

WFKA Seasons

2012 Season

2013 Season

2014 Season

2015 Season

2016 Season 

Mens Competition

Premiers: Bidyadanga Emus

Bullen Medal (Best & Fairest): Angelo Thomas (Bidyadanga) & Hayden McLeod (Bulls)

2017 Season 

Mens Competition

Premiers: Broome Bulls

Bullen Medal (Best & Fairest): Wade Wundungin (Derby Tigers)

2018 Season

2019 Season

2020 Season

2021 Season 

Mens Competition

Premiers: Cable Beach

Bullen Medal (Best & Fairest): Tristram Pigram (Saints)

2022 Season 

Mens Competition

Premiers: Cable Beach

Bullen Medal (Best & Fairest): Benjamin Goldie (Towns)

Womens Competition

2023 Season 

Mens Competition

Premiers: TBC

Bullen Medal (Best & Fairest): TBC

Womens Competition

Bullen Medal Winners

2013: Joseph Dann (Cable Beach)

2014: Hayden McLeod (Bulls)

2015: Gerrick Weedon (Derby)

2016: Angelo Thomas (Bidyadanga) and Hayden McLeod (Bulls)

2017: Wade Wundungin (Derby)

2018: Wade Wundungin (Derby), Anthony Treacy (Cable Beach) & Zephenier Skinner (Looma)

2019: Angelo Thomas (Bidyadanga)

2020: Not awarded due to COVID-19 pandemic

2021: Tristram Pigram (Saints)

2022: Benjamin Goldie (Towns)

References

External links
"Barefoot and Brilliant" The History of Football In Broome

Kimberley (Western Australia)
Australian rules football competitions in Western Australia